In particle physics, a plekton is a theoretical kind of particle that obeys a different style of statistics with respect to the interchange of identical particles. That is, it would be neither a boson nor a fermion, but subject to a braid statistics. Such particles have been discussed as a generalization of the braid characteristics of the anyon to dimension > 2.

References

Hypothetical particles
Parastatistics
Braids